Charles "Chay" Genoway (born December 20, 1986) is a Canadian professional ice hockey defenceman. He is currently playing with EC Red Bull Salzburg of the ICE Hockey League (ICEHL). He was selected and played for the Canadian men's ice hockey team at the 2018 Winter Olympics.

Playing career
An undrafted free agent from Morden, Manitoba, Genoway graduated from the University of North Dakota as the fourth-highest-scoring defenceman in UND history with 127 points in 168 career games. His 168 games are tied for the most by a UND defenceman, and he also ranks tied for second all-time among UND players rearguards in game-winning goals (seven), fourth in power-play goals (14), fifth in assists (101), and seventh in goals (26).

Upon completion of his collegiate career, Genoway was signed to a one-year entry level contract with the Minnesota Wild on April 12, 2011. In the 2011–12 season, his first as a professional, Genoway was assigned to AHL affiliate the Houston Aeros. In 72 games as a fixture on the Aeros blueline, he scored 7 goals and 36 points. He received his first NHL recall at the tail end of the season and made his NHL debut, registering an assist, in a solitary game for the Wild against the Phoenix Coyotes on April 7, 2012.

On June 29, 2012, he was re-signed to a one-year extension with the Wild. After 52 games with the Aeros during his second season within the Wild organization in 2012–13, he was traded to the Washington Capitals in exchange for a conditional seventh-round pick on March 14, 2013.

On August 1, 2014, having left the Capitals organization as a free agent, Genoway signed abroad on a one-year deal with Dinamo Riga of the Kontinental Hockey League (KHL). After a year in Riga, he moved on to fellow KHL team HC Spartak Moscow, where he spent the 2015–16 season. In May 2016, he signed with Jokerit, a Helsinki-based KHL team.

In the 2018–19 season, Genoway played under a one-year contract with Frölunda HC of the Swedish Hockey League (SHL). Genoway contributed to a highly successful season with Frölunda recording 9 goals and 25 points in 51 games in claiming the domestic Le Mat Trophy. He also led defenseman in points throughout the tournament to help claim the 2019 Champions Hockey League.

At the conclusion of his contract with Frölunda, Genoway opted to return to the KHL, agreeing to a one-year contract with Russian club, Torpedo Nizhny Novgorod on May 7, 2019. Genoway established new career highs in the KHL during the 2019–20 season, notching 25 assists and 31 points in 62 regular season games.

As a free agent, Genoway opted to continue in the KHL, securing a one-year contract with Avtomobilist Yekaterinburg on May 4, 2020.

Following the 2020–21 season, Genoway left the KHL after two further years and continued his journeyman career in returning to the SHL in signing an optional two-year contract with Brynäs IF on July 8, 2021.

As a free agent at the conclusion of his contract in the SHL, Genoway opted to continue his European career by signing a one-year deal with Austrian club, EC Red Bull Salzburg of the ICEHL on June 23, 2022.

International play

On January 11, 2018, Genoway was named to the Canadian men's ice hockey team for the 2018 Winter Olympics in Pyeongchang, South Korea. He registered 1 assist in 6 games to help Canada claim the bronze medal.

Career statistics

Regular season and playoffs

International

Awards and honours

References

External links

1986 births
AHCA Division I men's ice hockey All-Americans
Avtomobilist Yekaterinburg players
Brynäs IF players
Canadian expatriate ice hockey players in Finland
Canadian expatriate ice hockey players in Latvia
Canadian expatriate ice hockey players in Russia
Canadian expatriate ice hockey players in Sweden
Canadian ice hockey defencemen
Dinamo Riga players
Frölunda HC players
HC Lada Togliatti players
HC Spartak Moscow players
Hershey Bears players
Houston Aeros (1994–2013) players
Ice hockey people from Manitoba
Ice hockey players at the 2018 Winter Olympics
Jokerit players
Living people
Medalists at the 2018 Winter Olympics
Minnesota Wild players
North Dakota Fighting Hawks men's ice hockey players
Olympic bronze medalists for Canada
Olympic ice hockey players of Canada
Olympic medalists in ice hockey
People from Morden, Manitoba
People from Swan River, Manitoba
EC Red Bull Salzburg players
Torpedo Nizhny Novgorod players
Undrafted National Hockey League players
Vernon Vipers players